The 2020 Stanley Cup Finals was the championship series of the National Hockey League's (NHL) 2019–20 season and the culmination of the 2020 Stanley Cup playoffs. This series was between the Eastern Conference champion Tampa Bay Lightning and the Western Conference champion Dallas Stars. The Lightning won the best-of-seven series, four games to two, for their second championship in franchise history. The Lightning had home-ice advantage in the series with the better regular season record. The series began on September 19 and concluded on September 28. Due to the COVID-19 pandemic, the entire series was played behind closed doors at Rogers Place in Edmonton. The pandemic resulted in the league suspending the regular season on March 12, 2020, and then scheduling a special 24-team playoff format to be held in two neutral "hub cities" (Edmonton and Toronto) that began on August 1. Thus it became the first Stanley Cup Finals to be played in the month of September.

This was the first Stanley Cup Final series since  to be played entirely outside the Eastern Time Zone, the first since  to be played entirely in one location, the first since  to be played entirely in Canada, and the first since  to have the Stanley Cup awarded in a Canadian arena. This was the first Stanley Cup Final since  to feature a neutral site game and the first Stanley Cup Finals to feature two teams from the American Sun Belt (Texas and Florida).

The Dallas Stars set the record for most playoff games played by a team in a single postseason at 27 games.

Paths to the Finals

Return to play

On March 11, 2020, the World Health Organization declared COVID-19 to be a pandemic, and later that day, the National Basketball Association suspended all games after players tested positive for the disease. One day later, the NHL announced that the 2019–20 season had been paused indefinitely. On May 22, the league and the NHLPA agreed on a basic framework to stage a 24-team playoff tournament behind closed doors, conducted in two neutral "hub" cities to help protect teams from the virus. The details of the plan were announced publicly on May 26. The seeds would be based on each club's points percentage when the season paused on March 12, effectively scrapping the remainder of the regular season. In the opening round of the 24-team playoff format, the top four teams in each conference played each other in a separate Seeding Round-robin to determine the seeding in the First Round. The eight lower seeded teams in each conference played in the Qualifying Round, a best-of-five series to advance to the next round. The First Round through to the Finals remained as best-of-seven series. On July 10, along with the ratification of an extension to the collective bargaining agreement, the NHL and the NHLPA formally agreed to begin the playoffs on August 1 (concluding no later than early October), with games being hosted by Edmonton (Western Conference early rounds, Conference Finals, and Stanley Cup Finals) and Toronto (Eastern Conference early rounds). U.S. cities were also considered, but were passed over after several U.S. states experienced a spike in COVID-19 cases in late June.

Dallas Stars

This was the franchise's fifth appearance in the Finals. They won the Stanley Cup in 1999 before losing the Finals in 2000. They also made two appearances as the Minnesota North Stars in 1981 and 1991.

During the offseason, Dallas signed forwards Corey Perry and Joe Pavelski as well as defenceman Andrej Sekera in free agency. The team also re-signed defenceman Taylor Fedun and forward Jason Dickinson. The team made no trades during the regular season.

On December 10, 2019, head coach Jim Montgomery was dismissed due to "unprofessional conduct inconsistent with the core values and beliefs" of both the team and the league, and was replaced by Rick Bowness. Before joining the Stars organization, Bowness had served as associate coach with the Lightning from 2013 to 2018.

When the regular season was suspended on March 12, 2020, the Stars had a 37–24–8 record and a .594 points percentage to finish third in the Central Division and fourth in the Western Conference. After play resumed in the hubs, Dallas placed third in the Round Robin. The Stars then defeated the Calgary Flames in six games in the First Round, the Colorado Avalanche in seven games in the Second Round, and the Vegas Golden Knights in five games in the Western Conference Finals.

Tampa Bay Lightning

This was the Tampa Bay Lightning's third appearance in the Finals. They won the Stanley Cup in 2004 before losing the Finals in 2015.

During the offseason, Tampa Bay signed goaltender Curtis McElhinney, defencemen Luke Schenn, Luke Witkowski, and Kevin Shattenkirk, and forward Patrick Maroon during free agency. Tampa Bay also re-signed goaltender Andrei Vasilevskiy and forwards Cedric Paquette and Brayden Point. During the regular season, the Lightning traded for forwards Blake Coleman and Barclay Goodrow. They also signed Zach Bogosian whose contract had been terminated by the Buffalo Sabres during the season. During Phase 2 of the Return to Play plan, captain Steven Stamkos injured himself while skating, and subsequently missed the round robin and the first three rounds of the playoffs for the Lightning.

When the regular season was suspended on March 12, the Lightning had a 42–21–6 record and a .657 points percentage to finish second in both the Atlantic Division and the Eastern Conference. After play resumed in the hubs, Tampa Bay placed second in the Round Robin. The Lightning then defeated the Columbus Blue Jackets in the First Round, including winning Game 1 of the series that became the fourth longest game in NHL history, and the Boston Bruins in the Second Round in five games respectively. The Lightning then eliminated the New York Islanders in the Eastern Conference Finals in six games.

Game summaries
Note: The numbers in parenthesis represent each player's total goals or assists to that point of the entire playoffs.

Game one

In the first period of game one, neither team produced many shots, yet each scored a goal. The first goal came from Stars defenceman Joel Hanley who took an open pass from Roope Hintz. Tampa Bay equalized the score on left winger Yanni Gourde's skate deflection. In the second period, both teams produced more shots, however, Dallas was up by two at the end of the period. Jamie Oleksiak fired a wrist shot which rebounded back to him which he then shot it over Lightning goalie Andrei Vasilevskiy to make it 2–1. The Stars' third goal started in their own end with Esa Lindell passing to Joel Kiviranta. Kiviranta then skated through centre, firing a shot that was blocked, but picked up the rebound to put it past Vasilevskiy for a 3–1 lead. In the third period, the Stars played more defensively, putting up only two shots compared to the Lightning who fired twenty-two shots at Anton Khudobin. The Stars held their ground for the remaining 20 minutes, and Jason Dickinson's empty-net goal sealed a 4–1 victory for Dallas.

Game two

In game two, the Lightning struck three times in the first period. Twice on the power-play, Victor Hedman and Nikita Kucherov set up both goal-scorers. The first came from a tic-tac-toe pass to Brayden Point firing it past Stars goalie Anton Khudobin. The second goal was another set-up pass; this time Kucherov fed it through the middle where Ondrej Palat made it 2–0. The Lightning made it 3–0 when the Stars fumbled the puck in their own zone and Anthony Cirelli gave it to Kevin Shattenkirk, whose shot at the blue line deflected off of Esa Lindell and past Khudobin. In the second period, the Stars shot eighteen times at Andrei Vasilevskiy and caught a break on the power-play. During Palat's slashing penalty, John Klingberg's shot deflected off of fellow Stars forward Joe Pavelski to cut the score to 3–1. Later in the period, a hit on Stars player Blake Comeau caused a skirmish to erupt, with Dallas players Corey Perry and Klingberg against Cedric Paquette and Hedman respectively. All players received simultaneous roughing penalties. In the third period, the Stars made it 3–2 when Mattias Janmark's shot snuck past Vasilevskiy. The Lightning kept their offense going in the final 20 minutes, pouring twelve shots on Khudobin, holding off the Stars, and ending the game 3–2 to tie the series 1–1.

Game three

In game three, Dallas put the heat on Andrei Vasilevskiy in the first period. However, among their sixteen shots, only one goal was successfully scored compared to the Lightning's two. Tampa Bay's first came from a misplay by Miro Heiskanen giving Nikita Kucherov a breakaway, sniping the puck past Anton Khudobin. Their second goal came from their captain Steven Stamkos returning from injury for his first game since being injured on February 25. After a rush by the Stars was stopped in the offensive zone, Victor Hedman passed the puck to Stamkos, who was racing on the right side, upon which he fired his shot over Khudobin's blocker to make it 2–0. The Stars' lone goal of the period came short-handed when a shot by Roope Hintz was stopped by Vasilevskiy. The rebound of that save went back to Hintz in the left corner who then passed to an open Jason Dickinson, whose shot got through Vasilevskiy to make it 2–1. The Lightning had a more dominant approach in the second period, putting off 21 shots and scoring three times. The first goal came following Alexander Radulov's hooking penalty which carried over from the first period. After a puck battle behind the net, Anthony Cirelli, who was falling down on the play, passed to Hedman who shot the puck under Khudobin's stick into the net. Tampa Bay's fourth goal arrived when the Stars began a line change and a 3-on-1 developed with Kucherov leading the rush and Brayden Point scoring the goal. The Lightning continued their offensive zone coverage towards the end of the period and in the final minute-and-a-half, Point fired a shot that rebounded to Ondrej Palat, who put it into the net for a 5–1 lead. Dallas then pulled Khudobin before the third period, replacing him with rookie Jake Oettinger. The Stars, showing some frustration, began roughing the Lightning on three occasions: the first with Mattias Janmark and Palat; then both Jamie Benn and Jan Rutta, who had a skirmish after the play, both earning misconducts as a result; and an errant cross-check at 18:05 by Joe Pavelski on Cedric Paquette, which caused a ruckus with both teams. Heiskanen's goal gave the Stars some life in the third period, but Tampa Bay's defense kept the Stars at bay, winning the game 5–2 and taking a 2–1 series lead.

Game four

The Tampa Bay Lightning overcame a 2–0 deficit in game four. In the first period, John Klingberg gave the Stars their first goal of the game subsequently on their first shot. The Stars gained a 2–0 lead when Jamie Benn set up Joe Pavelski, whose wrist shot got under Andrei Vasilevskiy. Tampa Bay got on the board with 33 seconds remaining in the period. The play began when defenceman Kevin Shattenkirk, from behind the Lightning net, gave an outstretched pass to Ondrej Palat, who then passed across to the right boards to find a solitary Brayden Point. He maneuvered around Anton Khudobin, going to his backhand to score. Point then tied the game early in the second period, on the power-play. During the Stars' penalty, Alex Killorn made a pass to the front, but the puck deflected off of Andrej Sekera's skate into the air, which Point then batted it into the net. The Stars soon regained the lead when Tyler Seguin's pass around Vasilevskiy got picked up by Corey Perry who, although tied up by Cedric Paquette, allowed the puck to trickle in off his stick. The Lightning tied the game up again when Andrew Cogliano got caught for hooking and on the ensuing Tampa Bay power-play, Mikhail Sergachev set up Nikita Kucherov for a one-timer, but the puck deflected off of Esa Lindell to Yanni Gourde who shot it past Khudobin. In the third period, Killorn put the Lightning up 4–3 when he went out around the net and shot at the top corner behind Khudobin. Pavelski tied the game 4–4 after picking up the rebound of Seguin's shot and then launching the puck at Vasilevskiy which deflected off of Shattenkirk into the net. Into overtime, Benn pushed down Tyler Johnson; controversially, he was called for tripping. While on the ensuing power-play, Patrick Maroon won an offensive zone face-off, sending it back to Victor Hedman. Hedman then passed it to Shattenkirk, whose shot at a sharp angle went over Khudobin's right pad for the game-winning goal and a 3–1 series lead.

Game five

Corey Perry opened the scoring in the first period of game five. Jamie Oleksiak passed to Tyler Seguin, who then dropped it for Perry to score the initial goal for Dallas. In the second period, the Lightning struck back when Nikita Kucherov passed to Ondrej Palat and he skated past the Dallas defencemen and goaltender Anton Khudobin with a backhand to tie the game 1–1. The Lightning kept putting the pressure on the Stars for the remainder of the second period, firing away 13 shots. In the third period, Mikhail Sergachev's blast from the point gave the Lightning a 2–1 lead. The Stars tied the game 2–2 when Miro Heiskanen's shot from the point rebounded to Joe Pavelski, who put it past Andrei Vasilevskiy to break the record held by Joe Mullen for most career playoff goals scored by a US-born player. The two teams remained tied after the fact heading into overtime. In the first overtime, Dallas put up two shots compared to Tampa Bay's seven, but no goals were scored and the game continued on to double overtime. At 9:23 of the second overtime, Perry picked up a rebound from Seguin's shot and slid the puck past Vasilevskiy to give the Stars the game 3–2, forcing a sixth game.

Game six

In game six, the Lightning took a 1–0 lead in the first period. After John Klingberg was penalized for tripping, Brayden Point fired a wrist shot that flew past Anton Khudobin after following the rebound of his own initial shot. Tampa Bay gained a 2–0 lead in the second period when a Stars turnover to Patrick Maroon got to Cedric Paquette, who set up Blake Coleman for a one-timer. The Stars remained scoreless for the rest of the game, but they had a close chance in the second period when Joel Kiviranta's shot was stopped by Andrei Vasilevskiy with his skate. Although had a goal been scored, it would have been disallowed as Corey Perry was penalized for goaltender interference on the play. The Lightning held Dallas to just 8 shots in the first two periods combined. Vasilevskiy continued his shutout in the third period, stopping all 22 shots by Dallas, earning his first playoff shutout. With a 2–0 victory, the Tampa Bay Lightning won their second Stanley Cup. Lightning defenceman Victor Hedman was given the Conn Smythe Trophy as the most valuable player of the playoffs.

Team rosters
Years indicated in boldface under the "Finals appearance" column signify that the player won the Stanley Cup in the given year.

Dallas Stars

Tampa Bay Lightning

Stanley Cup engraving
The Stanley Cup was presented to Lightning captain Steven Stamkos by NHL commissioner Gary Bettman following the Lightning's 2–0 win in game six.

The following Lightning players and staff qualified to have their names engraved on the Stanley Cup:

2019–20 Tampa Bay Lightning

Engraving notes
Tampa Bay had 28 players on their extended official team roster during the 2020 playoffs. Of those, 27 automatically qualified to have their names engraved. 
 #91 Steven Stamkos^ (C/W-Captain) - played 57 regular-season games and one game in the finals. He missed 13 regular-season games and 24 of 25 playoff games injured. #17 Alex Killorn served as an Asst. Captain while Stamkos was injured. He qualified by playing in half of his team's regular season games and one game in the finals.
 #44 Jan Rutta (D) played 33 regular-season and five playoff games (four in the finals). He missed 19 regular-season and 18 playoff games injured. He qualified by playing four games in the final.
 #55 Braydon Coburn (D) played 40 regular-season and three playoff games (none in the finals). He qualified by playing in half of his team's regular season games.
 #2 Luke Schenn (D) played 25 regular-season and 11 playoff games (including one in the finals). He qualified by playing one game in the finals.
 #24 Zach Bogosian (D) played 27 regular-season games (18 games for Buffalo, nine games for Tampa Bay), plus 20 playoff games for Tampa Bay. Bogosian also missed 22 regular-season and four playoff games injured. He qualified by playing two games in the finals.
 #92 Alexander Volkov (RW) - played nine regular-season games and one game in the finals. He also played 46 games in the minors with Syracuse. He qualified by playing in one game in the finals.
 #7 Mathieu Joseph (RW) – 37 regular-season games and 29 games in the minors for Syracuse. He qualified by playing in half of his team's regular season games.
 #29 Scott Wedgewood (G) – did not play for Tampa Bay during the 2019–20 season, but played 20 games in minors for Syracuse (AHL). Wedgewood was an extra goalie who was carried for the playoffs in case of injuries but did not dress for any games. He was the only player on the roster who traveled with the team to the NHL Bubble not to have his name engraved on the Cup.
 #14 Patrick Maroon (LW) became the third player in the expansion era to win back-to-back Stanley Cups with two different teams. Maroon won with St. Louis in 2019 and Tampa Bay in 2020. The only two other players who have won back to back cups with two different teams since 1967–68 are Claude Lemieux, who won in 1995 with New Jersey and in 1996 with Colorado; and Cory Stillman, who won in 2004 with Tampa Bay and in 2006 with Carolina (the 2004–05 season was not played due to the lockout). Additionally, Maroon's first name was listed simply as “Pat” on the 2020 engraving, after being listed as “Patrick” the prior year.
 Four members of the team staff won both cups with Tampa Bay in 2004 and 2020, 16 years apart: Video Coach Nigel Kirwin, Athletic Trainer Tom Mulligan, Equipment Manager Ray Thill, and Senior Director of Team Services Ryan Belec.

Television and radio
In Canada, the series was broadcast by Sportsnet and CBC Television in English, and TVA Sports in French. In the United States, the Finals were split between NBC (Games one, and four through six) and NBCSN (Games two and three). The NHL initially had plans to produce broadcasts for each game using a skeleton crew on-site, such as cameramen and producers, and then each media partners' commentators on both TV and radio were to call the games remotely. The league then allowed both Sportsnet and NBC commentators into the hubs. As he had been doing throughout the playoffs, 74-year-old NBC lead play-by-play commentator Mike "Doc" Emrick called the Cup Finals off of monitors from his home studio in Metro Detroit, citing his advanced age as a potential risk for severe illness from COVID-19.  These were the final games that Emrick called; he announced his retirement on October 19, 2020.

References

Navigation

 
2019–20 NHL season
Stanley Cup Finals
Stanley Cup Finals
Stanley Cup Finals
Dallas Stars games
Ice hockey competitions in Edmonton
Tampa Bay Lightning games
21st century in Edmonton